Wang Yilin (born September 1956) is a Chinese business and oil magnate who was the chairman of the Board of China National Petroleum Corporation (CNPC) and the chairman of the Board of PetroChina. China National Petroleum Corporation (CNPC) is the world's largest company by market value according to Financial Times Global 2016, and the world's third-largest company by revenue according to the 2016 Fortune Global 500 list.

Wang, as the country's most influential business leader, has accompanied Chinese Communist Party general secretary Xi Jinping during many state visits, including to the UK, France, Kazakhstan, Russia, UAE etc.

In April 2011, Wang assumed the role of Chairman of China National Offshore Oil Corporation.

In November 2012, he was elected member of the 18th Central Commission for Discipline Inspection of the Communist Party of China.

Wang Yilin began to serve Chairman of CNPC in April 2015, and he started to hold a concurrent post as Chairman of PetroChina in June 2015.   In July 2017, Wang Yiling, the Chairman of CNPC, serves as the head of the Chinese National Delegation to the World Petroleum Congress in Istanbul.

On March 13, Wang was elected co-chairman of the Economic Committee of the Chinese People's Political Consultative Conference (PCC 2018).

On June 8, 2018, Wang Yilin met in Beijing with Kazakh President Nazarbayev, who is paying a state visit in China. Also, Wang has held talks with Bozumbayev, Kazakhstan's Minister of Energy, and Sauat Mynbayev, CEO of KazMunayGas (KMG), respectively.

On June 9, 2018, Wang was awarded a medal of friendship by President Nazarbayev of Kazakistan. President Nazarbayev's presidential decree, which was issued to address Wang Yilin's national honor, pointed out that Wang Yilin has made great contributions to the development of his country's social, economy, and cultural undertakings and the consolidation of friendship and cooperation among the people in Kazakhstan's national and social activities.

From August 28 to 31, 2018, Wang held talks with the President of Sudan, the President of South Sudan, the President of Chad, and the President of Niger respectively during their state visits to China for the Forum on China-Africa Cooperation (FOCAC 2018).

References

1956 births
Living people
Engineers from Jiangsu
Chinese business executives
Businesspeople from Jiangsu
Politicians from Lianyungang
Chinese Communist Party politicians from Jiangsu
People's Republic of China politicians from Jiangsu